Milan Bogunović (Serbian Cyrillic: Милан Бoгунoвић; born 31 May 1983 in Sombor) is a Serbian football defender.

Before signing with ZTE, he had previously played with Serbian clubs Red Star Belgrade, FK Jedinstvo Ub, FK Radnički Niš, FK Zemun and FK Voždovac, but also in Lebanon with Al-Nejmeh SC and another Hungarian club Diósgyőri VTK.

External links
 Profile and stats from Hungary at HLSZ. 
 Red Star 2004–05 squad at EUFO

1983 births
Living people
Sportspeople from Sombor
Association football defenders
Serbian footballers
Red Star Belgrade footballers
FK Jedinstvo Ub players
FK Budućnost Podgorica players
FK Radnički Niš players
FK Zemun players
Nejmeh SC players
FK Voždovac players
Diósgyőri VTK players
Zalaegerszegi TE players
Lombard-Pápa TFC footballers
FK Radnički Sombor players
Nemzeti Bajnokság I players
Serbian expatriate footballers
Expatriate footballers in Montenegro
Expatriate footballers in Lebanon
Expatriate footballers in Hungary
Serbian expatriate sportspeople in Montenegro
Serbian expatriate sportspeople in Lebanon
Serbian expatriate sportspeople in Hungary
Lebanese Premier League players